Nasr Athlétique de Hussein Dey is an Algerian professional football club based in Algiers, Algiers Province. The club was formed in the Léveilley district (El Magharia currently) in the Café de Ali Kaddour, at number 45 in 1947 as Nasr Athlétique de Hussein Dey .

History

Seasons

Key 

Key to league record:
P = Played
W = Games won
D = Games drawn
L = Games lost
GF = Goals for
GA = Goals against
Pts = Points
Pos = Final position

Key to divisions:
1 = Ligue 1
2 = Ligue 2

Key to rounds:
DNE = Did not enter
Grp = Group stage
R1 = First Round
R2 = Second Round
R32 = Round of 32

R16 = Round of 16
QF = Quarter-finals
SF = Semi-finals
RU = Runners-up
W = Winners

Division shown in bold to indicate a change in division.
Top scorers shown in bold are players who were also top scorers in their division that season.

Notes

References 

Seasons
 
NA Hussein Dey